Mathison is a surname, and may refer to:

 Alonzo J. Mathison (1876-1941), American politician
Brooke Mathison, fictional character
 Bruce Mathison (born 1959), former American football quarterback
 Cameron Mathison (born 1969), Emmy-nominated actor
 Carrie Mathison, a fictional character from Homeland
 Gordon Mathison (10 August 1883-1915), Australian physician, medical researcher, and soldier
 James Mathison (born 1978), Australian television presenter
 John Mathison (1901–1982), New Zealand politician of the Labour Party
 Lisa Mathison (born 1985), professional cyclist
 Melissa Mathison (1950–2015), American screenwriter
 Volney Mathison (20th century), American chiropractor

See also
 Matheson (surname)
 Mathieson

Patronymic surnames
Surnames from given names